Frøyland og Orstad Church is a parish church of the Church of Norway in Klepp Municipality in Rogaland county, Norway. It is located in the village of Orstad. It is the church for the Frøyland og Orstad parish which is part of the Jæren prosti (deanery) in the Diocese of Stavanger. This parish is unique in Norway since it includes parts of two municipalities: Klepp and Time, encompassing the whole Kvernaland area.  

The white, concrete church was built in a rectangular style in 2008 using designs by the architects René de Groth, Erik Thesen, and Kolbjørn Jensen who are from the firm . The church seats about 630 people.

The church was consecrated on 14 December 2008. The church cost . The church is the first church in the Church of Norway to have a baptismal pool in addition to a baptismal font.

See also
List of churches in Rogaland

References

Klepp
Time, Norway
Churches in Rogaland
21st-century Church of Norway church buildings
Churches completed in 2008
2008 establishments in Norway